Strongylos is a village in the Famagusta District of Cyprus, located  northwest of Vatili. It is under the de facto control of Northern Cyprus.

References

Communities in Famagusta District
Populated places in Gazimağusa District